
Gmina Piaski is a rural gmina (administrative district) in Gostyń County, Greater Poland Voivodeship, in west-central Poland.

Villages
Gmina Piaski contains the villages and settlements of Anteczków, Bielawy Szelejewskie, Bodzewko Drugie, Bodzewko Pierwsze, Bodzewo, Drogoszewo, Drzęczewo Drugie, Drzęczewo Pierwsze, Głogówko, Godurowo, Grabonóg, Józefowo, Lafajetowo, Lipie, Łódź, Michałowo, Piaski, Podrzecze, Rębowo, Smogorzewo, Stefanowo, Strzelce Małe, Strzelce Wielkie, Szelejewo Drugie, Szelejewo Pierwsze, Talary and Tanecznica.

Neighbouring gminas
Gmina Piaski is bordered by the gminas of Borek Wielkopolski, Dolsk, Gostyń, Krobia, Pępowo and Pogorzela.

References
Polish official population figures 2006

Piaski
Gmina Piaski